Adam Owen (born 5 September 1980) is a Welsh UEFA Professional Coaching License football manager, coach and former player. He is currently an assistant manager with Scottish club Hibernian. He attained a Ph.D. in Sport and Exercise Science & Coaching from the Université de Lyon, France.

Playing career
Owen was born and raised in Wrexham, North Wales. He signed as a professional player for Wrexham upon leaving school at the age of 16. After a loan spells at Newtown in the Welsh Premier League, he played for various clubs in the Welsh Premier League such as Connah's Quay and Cefn Druids. He also played for Scottish club East Stirlingshire during the 2005–06, season making 13 league appearances in the Scottish Football League before moving back to Wales. Owen represented Wales at University level, playing against England and Scotland in the British University Games.

Coaching career
Owen started his coaching career at Wrexham whilst still playing. Upon leaving Wrexham, he joined Scottish club Celtic. Following a two-year period working at Celtic Park under Martin O'Neill & Gordon Strachan as Fitness Coach and Youth Academy Coach, at the age of 25 years old Owen joined Paul Sturrock's management team at Sheffield Wednesday where he remained for 12 months in the English Championship, also working under Brian Laws. During his time at Hillsborough, Owen was approached and accepted the 'Head of Performance' position at Rangers. During his time at Rangers the club experienced success domestically winning the SPL League Championship, Scottish Cup and Scottish League Cup on several occasions, also being involved in several UEFA Champions League and UEFA Cup campaigns culminating in the 2008 UEFA Cup Final in Manchester.

Following nearly seven years at Rangers, he moved to English club Sheffield United in May 2013 to take up the dual role of Assistant Manager and Performance Director. After 12 months in Sheffield, in the summer of 2014 Owen left to join Swiss club Servette on a three-year contract adding a promotion and league championship at his time with the club.

After seeing out his contract with Servette, Owen joined Polish Ekstraklasa club Lechia Gdańsk at the end of June 2017. He left his position in March 2018 citing a change of club philosophy as the reason, but stated the chance to manage such a big club at a young age was an incredible experience and one he was immensely proud of. 

Following Lechia Gdańsk Owen again joined up with Chris Coleman signing a two-year contract as his assistant coach in Hebei China Fortune FC in the Chinese Super League, with Hebei CCFC narrowly missing out on the Asian Champions League places having risen through the league. During this period Owen worked with players such as Gervinho, Ezequiel Lavezzi, and Javier Mascherano. In the January 2020, it was announced that having been approached, Owen accepted the dual-role as High-Performance & Technical Advisor with the Major League Soccer 2019 Champions Seattle Sounders FC. During this period Seattle Sounders were Western Conference Champions & finalists in the 2020 MLS Cup. Upon resigning his position to return to Europe due to the pandemic situation he now works as Technical Advisor with Lech Poznań.

In June 2022 he joined Scottish club Hibernian as an assistant manager.

International work
Owen was a part of the Wales management staff from August 2009 initially working under both Brian Flynn and Gary Speed. He was part of Chris Coleman's successful 2016 European Championships management staff reaching the semi-final stage versus Portugal. He remained in the Wales backroom team under new manager Ryan Giggs but left his position following their 2018 China Cup Final appearance versus Uruguay.

Additional
Apart from his main coaching and performance positions, Owen held a coaching consultancy role with Portuguese club Benfica as a 'Head of Football Development & Research' within the famed BenficaLAB generating significant amounts of 'football coaching research within the club'. He has amassed over 90 publications and book chapters in the area of 'Sport and Football Coaching Science'. Owen is author of the best seller 'Football Conditioning: A Modern Scientific Approach' coaching science book.

Owen also holds an Associate Researcher role with Université de Lyon in France, is an Associate Professor for Wrexham Glyndŵr University and continues as Coach Educator for the England Football Association and the Football Association of Finland.

Honours

Coaching

Club
Rangers
 Scottish Premier League: 2008–09, 2009–10, 2010–11
 Scottish Third Division: 2012–13
 Scottish Cup: 2007–08, 2008–09
 Scottish League Cup: 2007–08, 2009–10, 2010–11
 UEFA Cup Finalist: 2007–08

Servette
 Swiss Promotion League: 2015–16

Seattle Sounders
 MLS Cup: Finalist 2020

Lech Poznań 
 Ekstraklasa Champions 2021-22

International
Wales
 China Cup: Finalist 2018

References

1980 births
Living people
Welsh footballers
Association football coaches
East Stirlingshire F.C. players
Scottish Football League players
Association football defenders
Welsh football managers
Celtic F.C. non-playing staff
Rangers F.C. non-playing staff
Sheffield Wednesday F.C. non-playing staff
Sheffield United F.C. non-playing staff
Seattle Sounders FC non-playing staff
Lechia Gdańsk managers
Welsh expatriate football managers
Welsh expatriate sportspeople in Poland
Welsh expatriate sportspeople in China
Expatriate football managers in Poland
Welsh expatriate sportspeople in Switzerland
Welsh expatriate sportspeople in the United States
Hibernian F.C. non-playing staff